Terry Johnson (born 28 June 1941) is a former English cricketer.  Johnson was a right-handed batsman.  He was born in Grantham, Lincolnshire.

Johnson made his debut for Lincolnshire in the 1963 Minor Counties Championship against the Yorkshire Second XI.  Johnson played Minor counties cricket for Lincolnshire from 1963 to 1976, which included 72 Minor Counties Championship matches.  He made his List A debut against Northumberland in the 1971 Gillette Cup.  He played 4 further List A matches for Lincolnshire, the last coming against Derbyshire in the 1976 Gillette Cup.  In his 5 matches, he scored 33 runs at an average of 6.60, with a high score of 14.

References

External links
Terry Johnson at ESPNcricinfo
Terry Johnson at CricketArchive

1941 births
Living people
People from Grantham
English cricketers
Lincolnshire cricketers